Kageneckia lanceolata is a species of plant in the family Rosaceae. It is found in Bolivia and Peru. It is threatened by habitat loss.

References

lanceolata
Vulnerable plants
Flora of Peru
Flora of Bolivia
Taxonomy articles created by Polbot